George Browning may refer to:
George L. Browning (1867–1947), Justice, Virginia Supreme Court
George Browning (bishop) (born 1942), Anglican bishop of Canberra and Goulburn, Australia
George Browning (cricketer) (1858–1900), Australian cricketer
George M. Browning Jr. (born 1928), United States Air Force general
George W. Browning (1870–1961), American politician in the Virginia House of Delegates